In string theory, a worldsheet is a two-dimensional manifold which describes the embedding of a string in spacetime. The term was coined by Leonard Susskind  as a direct generalization of the world line concept for a point particle in special and general relativity.

The type of string, the geometry of the spacetime in which it propagates, and the presence of long-range background fields (such as gauge fields) are encoded in a two-dimensional conformal field theory defined on the worldsheet. For example, the bosonic string in 26 dimensions has a worldsheet conformal field theory consisting of 26 free scalar bosons. Meanwhile, a superstring worldsheet theory in 10 dimensions consists of 10 free scalar fields and their fermionic superpartners.

Mathematical formulation

Bosonic string 

We begin with the classical formulation of the bosonic string. 

First fix a -dimensional flat spacetime (-dimensional Minkowski space), which serves as the ambient space for the string.

A world-sheet  is then an embedded surface, that is, an embedded 2-manifold , such that the induced metric has signature  everywhere. Consequently it is possible to locally define coordinates  where  is time-like while  is space-like.

Strings are further classified into open and closed.

That is,  is a periodic coordinate with the identification . The redundant description (using quotients) can be removed by choosing a representative .

World-sheet metric 
In order to define the Polyakov action, the world-sheet is equipped with a world-sheet metric , which also has signature  but is independent of the induced metric.

Since Weyl transformations are considered a redundancy of the metric structure, the world-sheet is instead considered to be equipped with a conformal class of metrics . Then  defines the data of a conformal manifold with signature .

References 

String theory